Wiang Nuea, Mueang Lampang is a village and tambon (subdistrict) of Mueang Lampang District, in Lampang Province, Thailand. In 2005, it had a population of 12,008 people.

References

Tambon of Lampang province
Populated places in Lampang province